De Vis's emo skink (Emoia pallidiceps) is a species of skink. It is found in New Guinea and the Bismarck Archipelago.

Names
It is known as mas in the Kalam language of Papua New Guinea, a name also applied to Emoia baudini.

References

pallidiceps
Skinks of New Guinea
Reptiles described in 1890
Taxa named by Charles Walter De Vis